The Cotabambas Province is a province located in the Apurímac Region of Peru. The province has a population of 44,028 inhabitants. The capital of this province is the city of Tambobamba.

Boundaries
North: Cusco Region
East: Cusco Region
South: Cusco Region
West: Abancay Province, Grau Province, Antabamba Province

Geography 
Other mountains are listed below:

Political division

Tambobamba
Cotabambas
Coyllurqui
Haquira
Mara
Challhuahuacho

Ethnic groups 
The people in the province are mainly indigenous citizens of Quechua descent. Quechua is the language which the majority of the population (90.18%) learnt to speak in childhood, 9.55 	% of the residents started speaking using the Spanish language and  0.17% using Aymara (2007 Peru Census).

See also 
 Markansaya
 Qiwllaqucha

References

External links

www.cotabambas.com

Provinces of the Apurímac Region